Holliday Lake State Park is a state park located within the confines of Appomattox-Buckingham State Forest in Virginia.  The land was cleared as farmland in the 1880s before being returned to its forested state in the mid-20th century.  Today, the park is known for its fishing opportunities.

The park was one of four recreational areas developed by the Virginia Division of Forestry (now the Virginia Department of Conservation and Recreation) working in conjunction with the Civilian Conservation Corps (CCC) during the Depression.  The central water feature at Holliday Lake is the 150-acre man-made lake. Contributing resources include Picnic Shelter #1, Wellhouse (c. 1939), the Dam/Spillway/Bridge/Lake, Drainage Culvert, Retaining Wall, and the Park Circulation System.  Adjacent to the park is the separately listed Holiday Lake 4-H Educational Center.

It was listed on the National Register of Historic Places in 2012.

References

External links 
Park website

Parks on the National Register of Historic Places in Virginia
State parks of Virginia
Parks in Appomattox County, Virginia
Parks in Buckingham County, Virginia
Civilian Conservation Corps in Virginia
National Register of Historic Places in Appomattox County, Virginia